Pitymys is a subgenus of voles in the genus Microtus. Species in this subgenus are:
Guatemalan vole (Microtus guatemalensis)
Tarabundí vole (Microtus oaxacensis)
Woodland vole (Microtus pinetorum)
Jalapan pine vole (Microtus quasiater)

Voles of this subgenus often show more adaptations for a fossorial mode of life.

References
D.E. Wilson & D.M. Reeder, 2005: Mammal Species of the World: A Taxonomic and Geographic Reference. Third Edition. The Johns Hopkins University Press, Baltimore.

Voles and lemmings
Animal subgenera